Kakay Wali is a village in Sialkot District in Pakistan.

Villages in Sialkot District